Local government elections took place in London, and some other parts of the United Kingdom on Thursday 13 May 1971.

All London borough council seats were up for election.  The previous Borough elections in London were in 1968.

Results summary

Turnout: 2,105,571 voters cast ballots, a turnout of 38.7% (+2.9%).

Council results

Overall councillor numbers

|}

References

 
London local elections
1971